Lawrence Russell Ellzey (March 20, 1891 – December 7, 1977) was a U.S. Representative from Mississippi.

Education
Born on a farm near Wesson, Mississippi, Ellzey attended the rural schools and was graduated from Mississippi College at Clinton, A.B., 1912.
He attended the University of Chicago in 1927.
He became a teacher in the consolidated county schools of Mississippi between 1912 and 1917.

Wartime
He volunteered as a private in the Quartermaster Corps on December 13, 1917, and served overseas nine months before being discharged as a first lieutenant on February 20, 1919.

Career in education
He served as superintendent of education of Lincoln County, Mississippi from 1920 to 1922. He was a teacher in the agricultural high school in Wesson from 1922 to 1928. He served as president of Copiah-Lincoln Junior College, Wesson, Mississippi from 1928 to 1932.

Career in politics
Ellzey was elected as a Democrat to the Seventy-second Congress by special election on March 15, 1932, to fill the vacancy caused by the death of Percy Quin.

He was reelected to the Seventy-third Congress and served from March 15, 1932 until January 3, 1935. He was an unsuccessful candidate for renomination in 1934 to the Seventy-fourth Congress.

Later employment
He later was employed in the life insurance industry. He worked as an executive secretary for the Mississippi Salvage Campaign from 1942-43.

Death
Ellzey died in Jackson, Mississippi on December 7, 1977, aged 86, and was interred in Wesson Cemetery, Wesson, Mississippi.

References

1891 births
1977 deaths
20th-century American businesspeople
20th-century American educators
United States Army personnel of World War I
People from Wesson, Mississippi
Politicians from Jackson, Mississippi
United States Army officers
Democratic Party members of the United States House of Representatives from Mississippi
20th-century American politicians
Businesspeople from Jackson, Mississippi